Yeh Chahatein Yeh Shiddatein is a 2016 Pakistani drama serial based on the novel by same name. The serial stars Anum Fayyaz, Shahzad Noor, Fawad Jalal and Ahmed Majeed in lead roles. It is produced by Babar Javed.

Plot 
Nawaira never thought her admirers will become a threat— her own cousins. Her engagement with Nawaz deeply hurts her other cousin, Raza, who is younger than her but has been in love with her since childhood.  Raza’s feelings for Nawaira begin to sabotage his relationship with his fiancée Rimsha, because she is aware of his infatuation. As a result, Rimsha develops resentment for Nawaira.

Shariq, happens to be another admirer of Nawaira. He is also madly in love with her. Nawaira, who is unaware of this fact, often visits his house to inquire about her sick aunt. This is where this love rectangle gets worse. His love turns into obsession and when he finds out about the engagement, he decides to conquer his love in any circumstances. He kidnaps Nawaira and the engagement gets called off— which causes chaos in the lives of Raza and Nawaz.

Cast

Anum Fayyaz as Nawaira
Shahzad Noor as Nawaz (Fiancé and Love interest of Nawaira)
Fawad Jalal as Shariq Zaman(Main Antagonist: step cousin of Nawaira having a disturbed past)
Ahmed Majeed as Raza (Nawaira's younger cousin who loves her since childhood)
Humaira Zahid as (Mother of Nawaz who's against the marriage of Nawaira and Nawaz, and want Nawaz to marry Romaisa)
Saba Faisal
Faisal Naqvi as Nabeel
Anam Tanveer
Aleezay Tahir as Ramsha
Azra Mansoor (Step-mother of Shariq)

Broadcast and Release
The serial premiered on Geo Entertainment airing episodes twice a week (Saturday and Sunday) at prime time, from 16 July 2016. Since August 2020, It is available for streaming on Amazon Prime.

References

External links

Yeh Chahatein Yeh Shiddatein- IMDb

Geo TV original programming
A&B Entertainment
2016 Pakistani television series debuts